The La Cañada Stakes is a Grade III American thoroughbred horse race for fillies and mares age four-years-old and older over a distance of one-and-one-sixteenth miles on the dirt track held annually in January at Santa Anita Park in Arcadia, California, USA.  The event currently offers a purse of US$200,000.

History

The event was named after a 1843 Mexican land grant known as Rancho La Cañada in the San Rafael Hills and Crescenta Valley of Southern California. The name means "ranch of the canyon". The rancho included the current day city of La Cañada Flintridge.

The inaugural running of the event was on 1 February 1975 over a distance of one-and-one-sixteenth miles and was won by the 1974 U.S. Champion Three-Year-Old Filly Chris Evert who carried 128 pounds, winning by a nose as the 13/10 favorite over Mercy Dee with Lucky Spell in third place  lengths away in a time of 1:41. The winning time recorded for the distance continues today to be the stakes record. 

The following year, the distance of the event was increased to  miles. The event was run at this distance until 2011.

Given the quality of competition after the first two runnings of the event in 1977 the American Graded Stakes Committee classified the event as Grade II. 

In 1978 Santa Anita Park administration created the La Cañada Series, a series of races for newly turning/turned 4-year-old fillies and run at an increasing distance. The series begins with the La Brea Stakes at 7 furlongs followed by the Grade II El Encino Stakes at  miles in mid January, then the upgraded Grade I La Cañada Stakes at  miles in mid February. Until the series ended in 2011 when the El Encino Stakes was discontinued, only three fillies had ever won all three races: Taisez Vous (1978), Mitterand (1985), and Got Koko (2003). The Santa Anita Park counterpart series for male horses is the Strub Series.

In 1990 the event was downgraded Grade II.

For three years (2008–10) the event was held on the synthetic All-Weather course which had been installed at Santa Anita Park.

With the discontinuation of the El Encino Stakes in 2012 the La Cañada Stakes distance was decreased to  miles and the race was scheduled in mid January.

In 2018 the event was run at a distance of one mile.

In 2019 the event was downgraded Grade III.

The 1986 winner Lady's Secret had an outstanding year culminating with a victory in the Grade I Breeders' Cup Distaff and winning the U.S. Champion Older Filly award and being voted as United States Horse of the Year. The 1996 winner Jewel Princess also won the Breeders' Cup Distaff and winning the U.S. Champion Older Filly award and being voted as United States Horse of the Year. While the 2000 Breeders' Cup Distaff winner Spain won two legs of the La Cañada Series and finished second in the El Encino Stakes.

Records
Speed record:
  miles:  1:41.60 – Chris Evert (1975)
  miles: 1:47.60 – Glorious Song (1980), Safe Play (1982)  

Margins:
  lengths – As Time Goes By (2022)

Most wins by a jockey:
 5 – Gary Stevens (1987, 1994, 1999, 2002, 2016)

Most wins by a trainer:
 4 – Bob Baffert (2004, 2011, 2017, 2022)

Most wins by an owner:
 2 – Eugene V. Klein (1986, 1987)
 2 – The Thoroughbred Corporation (2001, 2004)

Winners

Legend:

 
 

Notes:

§ Ran as an entry

See also
List of American and Canadian Graded races

External links
 2020 Santa Anita Media Guide

References

Horse races in California
Santa Anita Park
Graded stakes races in the United States
Flat horse races for four-year-old fillies
Mile category horse races for fillies and mares
Recurring sporting events established in 1975
1975 establishments in California
Grade 3 stakes races in the United States